Holladay Park is a public park in northeast Portland, Oregon, United States. The 4.34-acre park, located at Northeast 11th Avenue and Holladay Street, was acquired in 1870. Its features include a fountain, paved paths, picnic tables, and public art.

Sculpture
The park includes Constellation, an art installation by Tad Savinar with three sculptural elements: Flowers from a Neighborhood Garden (also subtitled Vase of Flowers), Isolated Molecule for a Good Neighborhood (sometimes abridged as Molecule), and Neighborhood Gardiner.

References

External links

 Holladay Park upgraded; rappers say promised police review report never released: North and NE Portland news by Casey Parks (September 10, 2014), The Oregonian

1870 establishments in Oregon
Parks in Portland, Oregon
Protected areas established in 1870
Sullivan's Gulch, Portland, Oregon